France Télévisions (stylized since 2018 as ) is the French national public television broadcaster. It is a state-owned company formed from the integration of the public television channels France 2 (formerly Antenne 2) and France 3 (formerly France Régions 3), later joined by the legally independent channels France 4 (formerly Festival), France 5 (formerly La Cinquième) and France Info.

France Télévisions is currently funded by the revenue from television licence fees and commercial advertising. The new law on public broadcasting will phase out commercial advertising on the public television channels (at first in the evening, then gradually throughout the day).

France Télévisions is a supporter of the Hybrid Broadcast Broadband TV (HbbTV) initiative that is promoting and establishing an open European standard for hybrid set-top boxes for the reception of broadcast TV and broadband multimedia applications with a single user interface, and has selected HbbTV for its interactive news, sports and weather service, and plans to add catch-up TV and social media sharing capability.

History 
From 1964 to 1975, French radio and television was monopolized through an organization known as the Office de Radiodiffusion Télévision Française. In an effort to stimulate competition, the organization was split in 1975 so that France's three television channels—TF1, Antenne 2, and FR3, would still be owned by the French government, but be operated independently from each other. However, the sale of TF1 to Bouygues in 1987 and increased competition from other new private broadcasters (such as Canal+ and La Cinq, the latter having been replaced by public channel La Cinquième after it ceased transmissions in April 1992) led to a decline in viewership for the two remaining public channels, which lost 30% of their market share between 1987 and 1989.  The channels were however saved when a single director-general was appointed to manage both Antenne 2 and FR3, becoming part of a joint entity known as France Télévision. They were renamed in 1992 as France 2 and France 3, respectively.

In August 2000, France Télévisions S.A. was formed as a holding company for France's public television channels, absorbing control of France 2, France 3, and La Cinquième (later renamed France 5). In 2004, Réseau France Outre-mer was absorbed by France Télévisions. Beginning in 2008, the President of France took the duty of naming the presidents for the French public broadcasters; they were previously nominated by the Conseil supérieur de l'audiovisuel. In 2013, under Francois Hollande, the previously adopted law was modified to return the power to nominate the presidents or French public broadcasters to the Conseil supérieur de l'audiovisuel .

Channels

National 

 France 2 – The company's primary channel with the second largest viewing audience.
 France 3 – The company's secondary channel, consisting of a network of regional stations.
 France 4 – Available only on digital television. Previously named "Festival" (1996–2005), and specializing in theatre, opera and French-language and other European originated drama, it is now a channel containing children's programmes, sports, sitcom, arts, music and entertainment.
 France 5 – Focuses on societal issues (health, education, politics...) with talk-shows and culture with documentary films.
 La Première – A network of radio and television stations operating in French overseas departments and territories around the world (formerly known as RFO - Réseau France Outre-mer, Outre-mer 1ère).
 France Info – Non-stop news channel, with support from Radio France, France Médias Monde and Institut national de l'audiovisuel.
  – A culture channel which launched on 1 February 2021 that replaced France Ô on TNT channel 19.

Thematic 
France Télévisions has an interest in a number of thematic cable/satellite channels in France:

France Télévisions holds 100% of France Télémusique SAS.

The thematic channel Planète Juniors (formerly Ma Planète) ceased operations in March 2009.

International 

France Télévisions holds 45% of the ARTE France holding company together with the French state (25%), Radio France (15%) and INA (15%). ARTE France and ARTE Deutschland form the ARTE Consortium that manages the bilingual French-German channel (ARTE shared its analogue channel with France 5, but both channels have separate full-time services on cable, satellite and digital broadcasts).

France Télévisions also controls the new R1 digital multiplex that currently hosts France 2, France 3, France 5, Arte and La Chaîne parlementaire. France 4 was originally on the R1 multiplex but was moved to R2 to allow space for regional channels on R1.

Subsidiaries 
 france.tv publicité – Advertising department of the group.
 france.tv distribution – Edition and commercial distribution of the programs of the group's channels on DVD, Blu-ray and VOD.
 france.tv studio – Production company composed of three labels:
 france.tv access – Responsible for subtitling for deaf and hard of hearing of all the programs of the channels of the group (quality charter recognized by AFNOR).
 france.tv doublage – Responsible for dubbing, audio description and subtitling of multilingual programs.
 histodio - Creation of sound works.
 France 2 Cinéma and France 3 Cinéma – Films production and support for French cinema.

Slogans
 7 September 1992 to May 2001: « Ça fait du bien quand ça s'allume », « Aucune hésitation, c'est France Télévision » / In English : "It does you good when it lights up", "No hesitation, it's France Television"
 May 2001 to September 2006: « Donnons de l’imagination à nos images » / In English : "Let's give imagination to our images"
 September 2006 to August 2008: « Vous avez tous les choix » / In English: "You have all the choices"
 August 2008 to September 2011: « Le choix de la différence » / In English: "The choice of difference"
 September 2011 to  September 2012: « Créer pour partager » / In English: "Create to share"
 September 2012 to 2018: « Bien différents, bien ensemble » / In English: "Very different, well together"
 Since 2018: « Plus rien ne se fera sans vous » / In English: "Nothing more will happen without you"

Logo gallery

See also 
 Radio France
 Television in France

References

External links 

 Official site 

 
Publicly funded broadcasters
Government-owned companies of France
European Broadcasting Union members
French-language television networks
Television networks in France
1992 establishments in France
Television channels and stations established in 1992